Ali Asfand (born 22 November 2004 in Faisalabad, Punjab) is a Pakistani cricketer who plays for Central Punjab. Asfand made his List A debut for Central Punjab against Northern during the 2021-22 Pakistan Cup on 16 March 2022. Asfand made his T20 debut for Central Punjab against Balochistan during the 2022-23 National T20 Cup on 30 August 2022. Asfand also played for the Pakistan national under-19 cricket team during the 2022 ICC Under-19 Cricket World Cup.

References

External links 
 
 Ali Asfand at Pakistan Cricket Board

2004 births
Living people
Pakistani cricketers
Central Punjab cricketers
People from Faisalabad